Oldenzaal is a railway station located in the centre of Oldenzaal, Overijssel, Netherlands. The station was opened on 18 October 1865 and is located on the Almelo–Salzbergen railway. Train services are operated by Syntus. From December 2010-December 2013, Syntus operated a cross-border local train between Hengelo, Oldenzaal and Bad Bentheim with the name "Grensland Express". Service was suspended due to a lack of passengers. On 14 January 2018, this route was reinstated when Keolis Deutschland extended its service from Bad Bentheim to Hengelo.

There was another station, close to the main Oldenzaal station, called Oldenzaal EO for train services to Boekelo (1890-1934). There was also a tram line to Denekamp (1903-1936).

Train services

Bus services

References

External links
NS website 
Dutch Public Transport journey planner 

Railway stations in Overijssel
Railway stations in Germany opened in 1865
Oldenzaal
Railway stations on the Almelo - Salzbergen railway line